Taplow Lake is a  lake just south of the A4 between Maidenhead and Slough in Amerden Lane, Buckinghamshire. Recreational activities on the lake include swimming, wakeboarding and waterskiing. A café is also located here serving breakfast and lunch. 

Lakes of Buckinghamshire